Lies of Light is a fantasy novel by Philip Athans, set in the world of the Forgotten Realms, and based on the Dungeons & Dragons role-playing game. It is the second novel in "The Watercourse Trilogy". It was published in paperback in September 2006.

Plot summary
Lies of Light is a novel in which a man is obsessed with accomplishing what he believes will be his greatest work.

Reception
Pat Ferrara of mania.com comments: "Lies of Light continues where it's objectivism-laden series opener Whisper of Waves left off in 2005."

References

2006 American novels
Forgotten Realms novels
Novels by Philip Athans